Blas Minor Jr. (born March 20, 1966), is a former professional baseball pitcher who played from 1992 to 1997. He would play for the Pittsburgh Pirates (1992-1994), New York Mets (1995-1996), Seattle Mariners (1996), and Houston Astros (1997).

After his playing career was over, Minor was a volunteer pitching coach at Hamilton High School.

Minor is the uncle of baseball player Daulton Jefferies.

References

External links

Ultimate Mets Database: Blas Minor – New York Mets-centric fan database.

1966 births
Living people
Algodoneros de Torreón players
American expatriate baseball players in Mexico
Baseball players from California
Buffalo Bisons (minor league) players
Carolina Mudcats players
El Paso Diablos players
Harrisburg Senators players
Houston Astros players
Huntsville Stars players
Louisville Redbirds players
Major League Baseball pitchers
Merced Blue Devils baseball players
Mexican League baseball pitchers
New Orleans Zephyrs players
New York Mets players
Ogden Raptors players
Pittsburgh Pirates players
Princeton Pirates players
Salem Buccaneers players
Seattle Mariners players
Tacoma Rainiers players
Tucson Toros players
People from Merced, California